Dixie Cove Marine Provincial Park, originally Dixie Cove Provincial Park, is a provincial park in British Columbia, Canada, located on the east side of Hohoae Island, which is just west of Fair Harbour in Kyuquot Sound on the West Coast of Vancouver Island.

References

Provincial parks of British Columbia
Kyuquot Sound region
1996 establishments in British Columbia
Protected areas established in 1996
Marine parks of Canada